Vladimir "Vova" Broun (born May 6, 1989), is an Uzbek-born Israeli footballer who plays as a defensive midfielder.

Honours

Club
Hapoel Kiryat Shmona
Israel Super Cup (1): 2015

Hapoel Be'er Sheva
Israeli Premier League (1): 2015–16, 2016-17
Israel Super Cup (1): 2016
Toto Cup (1): 2016-17

References

External links

1989 births
Sportspeople from Tashkent
Soviet Jews
Uzbekistani Jews
Living people
Israeli footballers
Hapoel Ramat Gan F.C. players
Hapoel Ironi Kiryat Shmona F.C. players
Hapoel Be'er Sheva F.C. players
F.C. Ashdod players
Hapoel Rishon LeZion F.C. players
Sektzia Ness Ziona F.C. players
F.C. Tira players
Footballers from Ramat Gan
Liga Leumit players
Israeli Premier League players
Uzbekistani emigrants to Israel
Association football midfielders